South Wigston railway station is a railway station serving South Wigston in Leicestershire. South Wigston station is owned by Network Rail and managed by East Midlands Railway (EMR) train operating company (TOC). Not all trains operating between Birmingham and Leicester stop here. Although the station is only served by CrossCountry, it is managed by East Midlands Railway as CrossCountry does not manage any stations.

The station is not staffed, so passengers buy the full range of tickets for travel from the guard on the train at no extra cost. Facilities on the platforms are limited, consisting only of one "bus shelter" type canopy on each of the two platforms to protect passengers from the weather, as well as a time-table, audible public address system and notice board.

History

However, British Railways closed all three stations by 1968.

The present South Wigston station was opened on Saturday 10 May 1986 and is at a new site about 300 metres east of the site of the former Glen Parva station. The new station cost £135,000 to build and was funded by Leicestershire County Council.

There has been talk of a car park for commuters on the adjacent wasteland within the Wigston railway triangle, but this has never been progressed and the land remains a haven for wildlife. There is a public car park on nearby Kirkdale Road, a  260-yard walk away, which from 2021 has been subject to car parking charges from Oadby and Wigston Borough Council.

The station was managed by Central Trains until 2007, who operated all trains calling at the station; when the franchise ended, the station management transferred to East Midlands Trains, who managed the station until 2019, when their franchise ended, and the station was transferred to East Midlands Railway. All services calling are operated by CrossCountry.

South Wigston station's two platforms are staggered, one each side of a wide footbridge over the railway.

Services
In the December 2018 Timetable, there are 2 return services per weekday to Stansted Airport, at other times connections are available at Leicester.

References

External links

Railway stations in Leicestershire
DfT Category F2 stations
Railway stations opened by British Rail
Railway stations in Great Britain opened in 1986
Railway stations served by CrossCountry
Transport in Leicester
Railway stations in Great Britain not served by their managing company